Snake Woman is a fictional character created by Shekhar Kapur and published by Virgin Comics for their Director's Cut line.

Credits
Created by Shekhar Kapur, written by Zeb Wells, with art by Michael Gaydos and covers by Jeevan Kang.

Plot summary
The plot of Snake Woman follows Jessica Peterson, a young introspective Midwestern girl who has moved to Los Angeles and works as a waitress in a downtown LA dive-bar. One night, a yuppie bar patron she mistakenly trusts accosts her, and during the attack, he reveals knowledge of an ancient order. Jessica is able to fight him off and ultimately kills him, experiencing a strange mixture of emotions, including arousal. The story draws on India's ancient Snake (Naga) legends, in which the soul of a serpent is reborn in the form of a beautiful and unsuspecting female. Jessica becomes increasingly possessed by her reptilian instincts and is driven to avenge a centuries-old wrong, finding herself a part of something far greater than herself.

Throughout the story, Jessica struggles with her human brain, including ethics, morals, and intellect, and her reptilian one, including instincts, senses, and survival patterns. As she discovers the power embedded in our reptilian selves, she confronts the humanity that tries to control it.

Characters

Jessica Peterson
The character of Jessica Peterson is portrayed as a quiet Midwesterner in her twenties who is torn between her intellect and her instinct. Her journey leads her to shed her skin and become more comfortable with her environment, which suddenly feels more alive.

Jin
Jess's roommate – a sexy, spunky, extroverted firecracker that's constantly pushing Jess to hook up with guys, “otherwise I will!”

Collections
The series is being collected into trade paperbacks:
 A Snake in the Grass (collects #1–5, 144 pages, June 2007)

See also
 Indian comics

External links
 Review of the first trade, Silver Bullet Comic Books, August 29, 2007

2006 comics debuts
Fictional snakes
Virgin Comics titles